Slipstream is the third studio album by Sherbet released in September 1974 and it peaked at No. 3 in Australia and was certified gold.

Track listing

Personnel 
 Lead vocals – Daryl Braithwaite 
 Bass, vocals – Tony Mitchell 
 Keyboards, vocals – Garth Porter 
 Drums – Alan Sandow 
 Guitar, vocals – Clive Shakespeare
 Co-producers – Richard Batchens, Sherbet 
 Engineer – Richard Batchens 
 Remastered by William Bowden

Charts

Weekly charts

Year-end charts

Certifications

Release history

References

Sherbet (band) albums
1974 albums
Festival Records albums
Infinity Records albums
Albums produced by Richard Batchens